Television in Nicaragua has a history of more than fifty years. Canal 8, the first terrestrial television channel in the country, started broadcasting on July 15, 1956. Currently there are more than 15 national terrestrial and cable TV channels.

Television channels

Terrestrial television channels

Cable television channels 
 Megabox (Channel 76 Claro TV)
 Atv98 (Channel 98 Claro TV)
 CDNN 23 (Channel 99 Claro TV)

Regional television channels 
 Telenorte Channel 48 ClaroTV Estelí)
 Canal 55 El Lider (Channel 55 UHF, Channel 48 Claro TV León and Chinandega, Nicaragua, Channel 110 Telecable León and Chinandega, Nicaragua)
 Canal 16 Ecovisión, Camoapa

Defunct television channels 
 ESTV (Canal 11) (rebranded as Vos TV (Canal 14) in 2010)
 Canal 15 (100% Noticias) (Channel 15 UHF, Channel 63 Claro TV)
 Magic Channel
 SSTV (defunct; 1979–1990)
 SNTV (defunct; 1990–1997)

Online TV 
 Nicaragua Entertainment

References